Paul Garza Gonzales  (born April 18, 1964) is an American former professional boxer, who won the light flyweight gold medal at the 1984 Summer Olympics.

Amateur career
Gonzales was the winner of the Val Barker Trophy for Outstanding Boxer at those Games, after having won a silver medal the previous year at the 1983 Pan American Games.

Amateur highlights 
 1983 United States Amateur Light Flyweight Champion
 1984 Olympic Light-Flyweight Gold Medalist at Los Angeles Games. Results were:
 Defeated Kwang-Sun Kim (South Korea) 5-0
 Defeated William Bagonza (Uganda) 5-0
 Defeated John Lyon (Great Britain) 4-1
 Defeated Marcelino Bolivar (Venezuela) 5-0
 Defeated Salvatore Todisco (Italy) walk-over

Professional career
Gonzales began his professional career on August 11, 1985 and, in only his third fight, captured the NABF Flyweight title by defeating veteran Alonzo Strongbow Gonzalez. He defended his title once, winning a unanimous decision over legendary future Bantamweight Champion Orlando Canizales on July 20, 1986. After losing a controversial decision to Ray Medel for the USBA Flyweight title on June 17, 1988, he again challenged Canizales. This time on June 10, 1990, and for Canizales' IBF Bantamweight belt. In the rematch, Gonzales was stopped by TKO in the 2nd round due to cuts.  After two more losses against lackluster competition, Gonzales retired in 1991.

Gonzales tried to run for office, but was defeated.  He was a car salesman. 
Gonzales was the acting president of the Queensland Olympic Council.

References

External links
 

1964 births
Living people
American boxers of Mexican descent
Boxers from California
Boxers at the 1983 Pan American Games
Boxers at the 1984 Summer Olympics
Olympic boxers of the United States
Olympic gold medalists for the United States in boxing
American male boxers
Medalists at the 1984 Summer Olympics
Pan American Games silver medalists for the United States
Pan American Games medalists in boxing
People from Pecos, Texas
Light-flyweight boxers
Medalists at the 1983 Pan American Games